Tsonevo Reservoir is a reservoir located in the valley of the Luda Kamchia River, 1 km from the village of Tsonevo.

The reservoir ranks third in size in Bulgaria with water service of 17300 decameters. Its old name was Georgi Traikov. It has warm waters, and is used for water supply and irrigation.

The reservoir is rich in fish such as bream, perch, rudd, and catfish. There are opportunities for fishing. The picturesque bed of the reservoir and the forested hills around it attract many tourists and offer great recreation possibilities. At Tsonevo reservoir there are bungalows, and private lodgings are offered in the adjacent villages of Tsonevo and Asparuhovo. At the latter, an ethnographical complex, Ovchaga, opened in 2006.

External links

Reservoirs in Bulgaria
Landforms of Varna Province